Colin Fleming and Ken Skupski were the defending champions; however, they lost to Eric Butorac and Travis Rettenmaier in the grand finale (6–4, 6–3).

Seeds

Draw

Draw

External links
 Main Draw

The Caversham International - Doubles
The Jersey International